Bernie Fabiosa (born July 23, 1954) is a retired Filipino professional basketball player and actor. He spent most of his playing days with the Crispa Redmanizers in the PBA.  During his heyday, he is tops in career steals, earning for himself the monicker The Sultan of Swipe.

Playing career
Fabiosa played 17 seasons in the PBA from 1975 to 1991. In 1981, he led the league in assists, tallying 8.4 points, 3.6 assists and 1.6 steals across his name. He also led the league in steals for seven seasons.

Bernie remained as one of Crispa's starters and kept his place as the Redmanizers' top assist man. When Crispa disbanded at the end of the 1984 PBA season, he was acquired by newcomer Shell Azodrin. He played two seasons for Shell before being traded and reunited with Crispa's old pals and former coach Baby Dalupan at Great Taste.

A dislocated shoulder caused by a nasty fall midway through the 1988 PBA season drastically affected his marketability. He had no takers when the 1989 season opened and Bernie played briefly for Crispa 400 in the PABL before being recalled by his former team Presto Tivoli. Fabiosa's comeback was unsuccessful as he suited up for only five games during the season.

In 1990, the Purefoods Hotdogs signed him up as coach Baby Dalupan believes he could still get some mileage from the veteran and one of the six remaining pioneers of the league. The following year, he suited up for Diet Sarsi and played 22 games in the All-Filipino Conference before retiring for good.

He finished his career with 6,597 points, 2,853 assists and 1,235 steals in 788 games. He converted 1,414/1,876 FTs for a career average of 75.4%. He is ranked No. 3 in all-time steals behind only Johnny Abarrientos and Ramon Fernandez.

In 2000, he was inducted to the all-time PBA 25th anniversary team.

Retirement and later career
After his playing days were over, Fabiosa dabbled into acting together with former Crispa teammate Atoy Co, where he took minor supporting roles in action movies.

Filmography

Source: Bernard Fabiosa - IMDb

Personal life
Fabiosa was previously married to former beauty queen Marilyn Manansala, with whom he has two children, Magnolia and Byron. He was also in a relationship with singer Malu Barry, with whom he has a child named Bernice.

Among his friends, he considered Philip Cesar and Atoy Co as his bestfriends. They called themselves PBA back in the old times, which stands for Philip, Bernard and Atoy.

He migrated to the United States in 2005 and now lives in Northridge in the northern California valley with his wife, Dr. Almi Valenzuela, a dentist.

References

1954 births
Living people
Filipino men's basketball players
Basketball players from Bohol
Male actors from Bohol
Point guards
Crispa Redmanizers players
Shell Turbo Chargers players
Great Taste Coffee Makers players
Magnolia Hotshots players
Pop Cola Panthers players
USJ-R Jaguars basketball players